During the 1928–29 season, Nelson Football Club played as a professional team in the Football League for the eighth time. After playing without a team manager during the previous season, Jack English was appointed to the post in the summer of 1928 following the club's successful re-election application. A record of 17 wins, 5 draws and 20 defeats, giving a total of 39 points, helped Nelson to a 15th-placed finish in the Third Division North, above Rotherham United on goal average. The team was inconsistent throughout the season, as they had been in the previous campaign, although significant improvements in the defense meant that 46 fewer goals were conceded. Nelson's attack was also improved, and the team scored at least once in 36 of their 42 league matches.

Nelson did not compete in the 1928–29 FA Cup, as they did not submit their application by the deadline. The club used a total of 26 different players during the season, but only six of these had been retained from the previous campaign. Yorkshire-born forward Bernard Radford was the top goalscorer for the second consecutive season, with a tally of 24 in 35 matches. With 11 goals, Gerry Kelly, a new signing from Sunderland, was the only other player to reach double figures. Half-back Jim Metcalfe made the most appearances for Nelson, missing only the final game of the season, the 4–4 draw away at Accrington Stanley. The highest attendance at Nelson's Seedhill ground was a record 14,979 for the visit of Bradford City on 27 April 1929, which stood until the stadium was demolished in 1980. Conversely, the lowest gate of the season was 2,749 for the victory against Stockport County on 22 January 1929.

Football League Third Division North

Key
H = Home match
A = Away match
In Result column, Nelson's score shown first

Match results

Final league position

Player statistics
Key to positions

CF = Centre forward
FB = Fullback
GK = Goalkeeper

HB = Half-back
IF = Inside forward
OF = Outside forward

Statistics

See also
List of Nelson F.C. seasons

References

Nelson F.C. seasons
Nelson